The Camden Rugby League Football Club is an Australian rugby league football club based in Camden, New South Wales, formed in 1910. They currently play in the Group 6 Rugby League competition.

In the 1920s the club competed in the Southern Districts Rugby League. They won premierships in that competition in 1922 and 1923. During the 1930s Camden mostly played for challenge cups, although they did participate in a Group 6 league competition in 1935. 
Camden returned to the re-formed Group 6 competition in 1946. Semi-finalists in 1947, Camden were minor premiers in 1948. Losing their semi-final to Picton, Camden exercised their right to challenge Bowral in a Grand Final. This match was drawn. In a replay, Camden triumphed by 14 points to five.
Further premierships were won in 1951, 1978, 1994, 1997, 1998, 2000, 2002, 2016

In 2015 Camden RLFC made the grand final in U18's (Div 1), Reserve Grade and First Grade but was unable to bring home a Premiership in any Grade.

Camden entered a team in the 2016 inaugural Ladies League Tag Group 6 competition taking out the minor Premiership and the Premiership after beating Campbelltown City in the grand final match.

Also in 2016 the U18s, Leaguetag and First Grade all won minor Premierships and went on to take home the Premiership trophy whilst Reserve Grade scrapped into 5th position and went on to win the Premiership. Camden RLFC is the first club in Group 6 CRL history to win the four premier competitions that it competed in the same season. #4from4

First Grade Premiership Coaches:-
2022: Camden Rams RLFC
(Captain Coaches - Mason Cerruto and Bradley Speechley)
2016: Camden Rams RLFC (Captain Coach- Scott Borg)
2002: Camden Rams RLFC (Captain Coach- Mitch Newton )
2000: Camden Rams RLFC (Captain Coach- Andrew Willis)
1998: Camden Rams RLFC (Captain Coach- Peter Gentle)
1997: Camden Rams RLFC (Captain Coach- Peter Gentle)
1994: Camden Rams RLFC (Captain Coach- David Greene)
1978: Camden Rams RLFC (Captain Coach- Rod Jackson)
1951: Camden Rams (Keith Clarke)
1948: Camden Rams (Herb Narvo)
1928: Camden Rams
1922: Camden Rams

In 2019 the Camden Reserve Grade team, coached by Andrew Willis went through the competition to complete the season as undefeated premiers. In the same year U18s won the Premiership and the Rams also won the inaugural Women’s Rugby League competition as undefeated Premiers. The club were named 2019 Club Champions.

With 2020 interrupted with COVID-19 the Rams didn’t field any teams except 3rd grade for the season.

In 2021 the season was cut short with finals not proceeding, again impacted by COVID-19, however Premierships were awarded to all first placed teams when the announcement was made. As a result the Rams Women’s Rugby League team won the premiership.

2022 saw the return of a full season with interruptions through the season but this time as a result of poor weather and flooding rendering grounds unplayable. It was also the first year of the merged competition under NSWRL know as the Wests Group Macarthur Competition, seeing the return of Campbelltown sides from Easts Campbelltown and collegians in First Grade and other clubs in lower grade competitions. 

The Rams finished the season proper as equal 1st in First grade but 2nd due to fore and against, Undefeated Premiers in Reserve Grade, 3rd in Women’s Rugby League, 5th in U18s, 4th in Conference Gold and out of the finals in Ladies Leaguetag. The WRL were defeated in the grand final whilst Reserve Grade won as Undefeated Premiers under coach Harrison Fox. However, the biggest upset of the day was when Camden defeated the much favoured East Campbelltown side with a convincing 30 - 4 win. It was the first time in the season the Rams had every 1st Grade player available to play, albeit Jackson Willis who played from the bench after badly dislocating a shoulder only weeks prior. Willis and Josh Goulton were the only returning 1st Grade Premiership winners from the 2016 team.

In 2022 The Rams player Danny Fualalo capped off a sensational season by being named the Wests Group Macarthur First Grade Player of the Year.

Notable players 
David Greene (Penrith Panthers)
Peter Gentle (St George Dragons)
Andrew Willis (Western Suburbs Magpies)
Jason Eade (Western Suburbs Magpies & Western Reds)
Mitch Newton (Canterbury Bulldogs, Australian Kangaroos) 
Scott Davey (Canterbury Bulldogs) 
Kevin Thomson (Balmain) 
Mark Thomson (Western Suburbs Magpies)
Ray Cashmere (1999–2012 Western Suburbs Magpies, West Tigers, Salford City Reds & North Queensland Cowboys
Dean Collis (Wests Tigers, Cronulla Sharks)
Shannon McDonnell (Wests Tigers, Newcastle Knights)
Mason Cerruto (Penthrith Panthers, Canterbury-Bankstown Bulldogs)
Danny Fualalo (Canterbury Bankstown Bulldogs)

Local Juniors played NRL or NRLW:
James Tedesco (2012– Wests Tigers / Sydney Roosters), NSW and Australian Captain
Dean Britt (2017– Melbourne Storm)
Abbi Church (2022- Parramatta Eels)

Local Juniors played NYC (U20):
Mark McCormack (Wests Tigers)
Jesse Jackson (Wests Tigers)
Zac Greene (Canterbury Bulldogs)
Will Kerr (Canterbury Bulldogs)
Jackson Willis (St George Illawarra Dragons)
Ben Powers (Wests Tigers)
Kereti Tautaiolefua (Sydney Roosters)
Bailey Dickinson (St George Illawarra Dragons)

See also

References

External links
Camden Rams website

Rugby league teams in Sydney
Rugby clubs established in 1953
1953 establishments in Australia
Camden, New South Wales